Fred Ames Hayner   (November 3, 1871 – January 14, 1929) was a Major League Baseball pitcher who played in  one game, on August 19, 1890 with the Pittsburgh Alleghenys of the National League. He pitched four innings in relief and allowed nine runs, six of which were earned. Hayner later became a sportswriter for the Chicago Daily News in Chicago and is credited (along with George Rice) with coining the name "Cubs" to refer to the team then known as the Chicago Colts, owing to their young age. The name was officially adopted in 1906.

Hayner also went to Lake Forest College and helped innovate the flying tackle in football.

External links

 http://collections.lakeforest.edu/items/show/2853

1871 births
1929 deaths
Sportspeople from Lake Forest, Illinois
Sportspeople from Janesville, Wisconsin
Major League Baseball pitchers
19th-century baseball players
Baseball players from Wisconsin
Pittsburgh Alleghenys players
Deaths from fire in the United States
Accidental deaths in Illinois